Sivapuram may refer to places in India:

 Sivapuram, Kerala, a village in Kannur district
 Sivapuram, Tamil Nadu, a village in Thanjavur district
 Sivapuram, Thiruvallur, a village in Thiruvallur district, Tamil Nadu